Shakhseya Aneeda is the 23rd full-length studio album by a Syrian recording artist Assala Nasri, released on September 20, 2012. With this release, Assala explores for the first time a new set of sounds and genres including Dance, Latin, and house, by collaborations with some of the biggest names in the Arabic music industry including Tarek Madkour, Hadi Sharara, Hassan elShafei, Tamer Ali, and Hossam Habib.

Track listing

International edition

References

2012 albums
Assala Nasri albums